The Story with Martha MacCallum, is an American television news/talk program on Fox News Channel currently hosted by Martha MacCallum. Episodes aired live from 3p.m. ET/2p.m. CT on Monday through Friday.  The show has been a part of the Fox News program lineup since January 9, 2017. In January 2021, the program moved from 7PM to the 3PM hour. Fill in hosts for MacCallum include Trace Gallagher, Gillian Turner, and Shannon Bream.

History
 
The show debuted under the title The First 100 Days with the premise of chronicling the presidential transition and beginning of the administration of Donald Trump. The show was renamed to reflect the end of the Trump administration's first hundred days on May 1, 2017, now focusing on a more broad news format with news analysis and interviews.

The Story with Martha MacCallum is broadcast from Studio F at 1211 Avenue of the Americas (also known as the News Corp. Building), New York City.

In January 2021, the program moved from 7PM to the 3PM hour, opening the 7PM hour to an opinion-based program called Fox News Primetime. In January 2022 Jesse Watters was named the permanent host of the hour with a new show called Jesse Watters Primetime.

Ratings
In the first month it aired, the show averaged 3.5 million viewers, up 79% compared to On the Record with Greta Van Susteren, which had occupied the same time slot the year prior. Since then, the program has averaged approximately three million viewers. In late 2020 and early 2021, ratings were around one million viewers.

References

External links
 Official website
 

 
 

2010s American television news shows
2017 American television series debuts
2020s American television news shows
Current affairs shows
English-language television shows
Fox News original programming